WGBJ (102.3 FM) is a commercial radio station licensed to Auburn, Indiana, and serving the Fort Wayne metropolitan area.  It is owned by Sarkes Tarzian and it broadcasts an alternative rock radio format, known as "Alt 102.3."  The studios and offices are on West Berry Street in Fort Wayne. 

WGBJ has an effective radiated power of 6,000 watts. The transmitter is on Quincy Street in Altona, Indiana, about 30 miles north of Fort Wayne.  Programming is also heard on 115-watt FM translator W258BY at 99.5 MHz in Fort Wayne.  The translator helps listeners in Fort Wayne who might have trouble receiving the 102.3 signal.

History

Country, AC and Modern Rock
102.3 FM signed on as WGTB in 1993, and aired a country music format. This lasted until January 1994, when it flipped to adult contemporary. It would switch flip back to country, and then to adult standards. In early 1999, the station flipped to Top 40/CHR as "Z102.3", WCKZ.

In March 2001, WCKZ became WEJE, taking the call sign and modern rock format of the former "Extreme 96.3," which changed to a country format.  (96.3 has gone through several other changes since and is now WXKE.)

Regional Mexican and Top 40
In September 2001, the station rebranded as "X102.3," with new call letters WXTW assigned shortly afterward. Following a sale from Summit City Radio Group to Three Amigos Broadcasting, WXTW adopted a Spanish-language Regional Mexican format as "Mega 102.3" at Midnight on September 1, 2006.

On September 21, 2009, the station adopted the slogan "Power 102.3" and flipped from Regional Mexican to a contemporary hit radio format. This move returned Top 40 hits to the Fort Wayne radio market.  On February 2, 2010, the station changed its moniker to "The Killer B102.3."

In the late hours of Saturday, April 3, 2010, WGBJ again changed formats from Top 40/CHR back to a Spanish contemporary format and started once again calling itself "Power 102.3".  The top 40 format remained absent in the Fort Wayne area until WJFX flipped to Contemporary Hits in 2012.

Alternative Rock
On January 9, 2019, Sarkes Tarzian, Inc. acquired that station for $515,000 and flipped it to a simulcast of WAJI-HD2 which was carrying an alternative rock format.  Programming is also heard on FM translator W258BY at 99.5 FM in Fort Wayne.  The two stations are now branded as, ALT 99.5 & 102.3.

On June 20, 2019, WGBJ rebranded as "Alt 102.3" as the 99.5 translator changed to a CHR format as "99.5 The Twenty-FM".

On September 8, 2022 at noon, WGBJ readded FM translator W258BY, which returned to simulcasting WGBJ.  (The "Twenty" format continues online and on WAJI-HD3.)  WGBY and W258BY returned to the brand "ALT 99.5 & 102.3".

Previous logos

References

External links

GBJ
Radio stations established in 1993
1993 establishments in Indiana
Alternative rock radio stations in the United States